Richmond Furnace is an unincorporated community in Franklin County, in the U.S. state of Pennsylvania.

History
A post office called Richmond Furnace was established in 1872, and remained in operation until 1965. The community was named after Richmond L. Jones, proprietor of a local blast furnace.

References

Unincorporated communities in Franklin County, Pennsylvania
Unincorporated communities in Pennsylvania